Kim Hak-bong (김 학봉, born ) is a South Korean male weightlifter, competing in the 69 kg category and representing South Korea at international competitions. He participated at the 2000 Summer Olympics in the 69 kg event. He competed at world championships, most recently at the 1999 World Weightlifting Championships.

He set one lightweight clean & jerk world record in 1998.

Major results
 - 1994 Asian Games Middleweight class
 - 1998 Asian Games Lightweight class

References

External links
 

1973 births
Living people
South Korean male weightlifters
Weightlifters at the 2000 Summer Olympics
Olympic weightlifters of South Korea
Place of birth missing (living people)
Weightlifters at the 1994 Asian Games
Weightlifters at the 1998 Asian Games
Medalists at the 1994 Asian Games
Medalists at the 1998 Asian Games
Asian Games medalists in weightlifting
Asian Games gold medalists for South Korea
Asian Games silver medalists for South Korea
World record setters in weightlifting
World Weightlifting Championships medalists
20th-century South Korean people